Partido Renovación Patriótica (Patriotic Renewal Party) is a leftist group in Honduras formed in 1990 as a re-groupment of various leftist tendencies, such as Fuerzas Populares Revolucionarias Lorenzo Zelaya, people from the dissolved Partido Comunista de Honduras and a dissident faction of the social democracy. In 1992 PRP merged with three other groups to form Democratic Unification Party.

Defunct political parties in Honduras
Defunct socialist parties in North America